St Mary's Church is an active Church of England parish church in the town of Mablethorpe, Lincolnshire, England. Built in the early 14th century, it was renovated with additions in 1714, and in 1976 it was extensively rebuilt. In 1966 the church was designated a grade II listed building.

History

In 1300 Sir Roger de Montalt donated the land for the church. He also donated the original arcade of the nave, octagonal piers and double-chamfered arches. The nave was rebuilt several times including in 1714, and in 1976. In 1978 the arches of the nave were timber struts fortified with the old piers left in place. In the church a communion rail dates to 1714. It features a set of turned baluster altar rails.

The church is located off Church Road, near to the town centre and the church is the main parish church of the town. On 31 May 1966 the church was designated a grade II listed building. In 1976 G.R.A. Mack of Louth rebuilt the majority of the church. The 1976 British Isles heat wave caused the clay bed to shrink and cracks developed on the structure.

Description
The church has been described as having a camel-back appearance. It has a low tower which is made of stone and brick. The lower part of the tower is stone and the upper part is brick. It also has diagonal stepped brick buttresses which are offset to the belfry and battlemented parapet. The materials used for construction were random mixed rubble, red brick,
and a slate roof. The chancel is made of brick and stone and has an eastern-facing window. The church font interior is panelled and dates to 1400. The west side of the aisle has a limestone ledger slab with a full-length figure. 

At the north aisle there is a brass plate with inscription for Sir Thomas Fitzwilliam (1403) and in the south aisle his wife Elizabeth (1403). There is brass plaque above the north door, for Elizabeth Fitzwilliam (1522) with a full-length portrait.

There is a tomb and Easter Sepulchre which dates to 1494 and it is thought to contain the remains of Thomas Fitzwilliam.

References

Grade II listed churches in Lincolnshire
Mablethorpe
1300 establishments in England
Mablethorpe